The Union Pacific Harriman Dispatch Center is located at 850 Jones Street in downtown Omaha, Nebraska. Called "the Bunker" by some, the Harriman is Union Pacific's rail traffic control headquarters, where the movement of more than 850 trains and nearly 36,000  miles of track across the country is controlled and monitored. Originally a freight depot, the building was redeveloped in the early 1990s as a way to unite 10 regional dispatch centers the UP once ran across the country.

The headquarters for Union Pacific, called the Union Pacific Center, is located nearby in downtown Omaha, Nebraska.

References

Properties of the Union Pacific Railroad
Buildings and structures in Omaha, Nebraska
Downtown Omaha, Nebraska